Kapkot Legislative Assembly constituency is one of the 70 assembly constituencies of Uttarakhand; a northern state of India. Kapkot is part of Almora Lok Sabha constituency.

Election results

2022

See also
 Almora (Lok Sabha constituency)

References

External links
 

Bageshwar district
Assembly constituencies of Uttarakhand